Axinidris murielae is a species of ant in the genus Axinidris. Described by Shattuck in 1991, the species is endemic to several African countries, where they inhabit forests.

References

Axinidris
Hymenoptera of Africa
Insects described in 1991